Originally, the name  Rusʹ referred to the people, regions, and medieval states (9th to 12th centuries) of the Kievan Rusʹ. Its territories are today distributed among Belarus, Northern Ukraine, Eastern Poland, and the European section of Russia. The term Россия (Rossija), comes from the Byzantine Greek designation of the Rusʹ, Ρωσσία Rossía—related to both Modern , and Ρωσία (Rosía, "Russia", pronounced [roˈsia]).

One of the earliest written sources mentioning the people called Rusʹ (as Rhos) dates to 839 in the Annales Bertiniani. This chronicle identifies them as a Germanic tribe called the Swedes. According to the Kievan Rusʹ Primary Chronicle, compiled in about 1113, the Rusʹ were a group of Varangians, Norsemen who had relocated somewhere from the Baltic region (literally "from beyond the sea"), first to Northeastern Europe, then to the south where they created the medieval Kievan state.
In the 11th century, the dominant term in the Latin tradition was Ruscia. It was used, among others, by Thietmar of Merseburg, Adam of Bremen, Cosmas of Prague and Pope Gregory VII in his letter to Izyaslav I. Rucia, Ruzzia, Ruzsia were alternative spellings.
During the 12th century, Ruscia gradually made way for two other Latin terms, "Russia" and "Ruthenia". "Russia" (also spelled Rossia and Russie) was the dominant Romance-language form, first used by Liutprand of Cremona in the 960s and then by Peter Damian in the 1030s. It became ubiquitous in English and French documents in the 12th century. Ruthenia, first documented in the early 12th century Augsburg annals, was a Latin form preferred by the Apostolic Chancery of the Latin Church.

The modern name of Russia (Rossija), which came into use in the 15th century, is derived from the Greek Ρωσία, which in turn derives from Ῥῶς, the self-name of the people of Rusʹ.

A hypothetical  predecessor of Kievan Rusʹ is the 9th-century Rusʹ Khaganate, whose name and existence are inferred from a handful of early medieval Byzantine and Persian and Arabic sources.

Etymology 

The most common theory about the origins of Russians is the Germanic version. The name Rus, like the Proto-Finnic name for Sweden (*Ruotsi), supposed to be descended from an Old Norse term for "the men who row" (rods-) as rowing was the main method of navigating the rivers of Eastern Europe, and that it could be linked to the Swedish coastal area of Roslagen (Rus-law) or Roden, as it was known in earlier times. 
The name Rus' would then have the same origin as the Finnish, Estonian, Võro and Northern Sami names for Sweden: Ruotsi, Rootsi, Roodsi and Ruoŧŧa. The local Finnic and Permic peoples in northern Russia proper use the same (Rus-related) name both for Sweden and Russia (depending on the language): thus the Veps name for Sweden and Swedish is Ročinma / Ročin, while in the Komi language spoken further east the etymologically corresponding term  Roćmu / Roć means already Russia and Russian instead.
The Finnish scholar Tor Karsten has pointed out that the territory of present-day Uppland, Södermanland and East Gothland in ancient times was known as Roðer or roðin. Thomsen accordingly has suggested that Roðer probably  derived from roðsmenn or roðskarlar, meaning seafarers or rowers. Ivar Aasen, the Norwegian philologist and lexicographer, noted proto-Germanic root variants Rossfolk, Rosskar, Rossmann.

George Vernadsky theorized about the association of Rus and Alans. He claimed that Ruxs in Alanic means "radiant light", thus the ethnonym Roxolani could be understood as "bright Alans". He theorized that the name Roxolani a combination of two separate tribal names: the Rus and the Alans.

Early evidence 
In Old East Slavic literature, the East Slavs refer to themselves as "[muzhi] ruskie" ("Rus' men") or, rarely, "rusichi."  The East Slavs are thought to have adopted this name from the Varangian elite, which was first mentioned in the 830s in the Annales Bertiniani. The Annales recount that Louis the Pious's court at Ingelheim am Rhein in 839 (the same year as the first appearance of Varangians in Constantinople), was visited by a delegation from the Byzantine emperor. The delegates included two men who called themselves "Rhos" ("Rhos vocari dicebant"). Louis inquired about their origins and learned that they were Swedes. Fearing that they were spies for their brothers the Danes, he jailed them. They were also mentioned in the 860s by Byzantine Patriarch Photius under the name "Rhos."

Rusiyyah was used by Ahmad ibn Fadlan for Varangians near Astrakhan, and by the Persian traveler Ahmad ibn Rustah who visited Veliky Novgorod and described how the Rus' exploited the Slavs.

When the Varangians arrived in Constantinople, the Byzantines considered and described the Rhos (Greek Ῥῶς) as a different people from the Slavs.

The earliest written mention of the word Rus appears in the Primary Chronicle under the year 912. When describing a peace treaty signed by the Varangian Oleg of Novgorod during his campaign on Constantinople, it contains the following passage, "Oleg sent his men to make peace and sign a treaty between the Greeks and the Rus', saying thus: [...] "We are the Rus': Karl, Inegeld, Farlaf, Veremud, Rulav, Gudi, Ruald, Karn, Frelav, Ruar, Aktevu, Truan, Lidul, Vost, Stemid, sent by Oleg, the great prince of Rus', and all those under him[.]"

Later, the Primary Chronicle states that they conquered Kiev and created what is now called Kievan Rus'. The territory they conquered was named after them as were, eventually, the local people (cf. Normans).

However, the Synod Scroll of the Novgorod First Chronicle, which is partly based on the original list of the late 11th Century and partly on the Primary Chronicle, does not name the Varangians asked by the Chuds, Slavs and Krivichs to reign their obstreperous lands as the "Rus'". One can assume that there was no original mention of the Varangians as the Rus' due to the old list predating the Primary Chronicle and the Synod Scroll only referred to the Primary Chronicle if the pages of the old list were blemished.

Other spellings used in Europe during the 9th and 10th centuries were as follows: Ruzi, Ruzzi, Ruzia and Ruzari. Sources written in Latin routinely confused the Rus' with the Rugii, an ancient East Germanic tribe related to the Goths. Olga of Kiev, for instance, was called "queen of the Rugii" (regina Rugorum) in the Lotharingian Chronicle compiled by the anonymous continuator of Regino of Prüm.

Spread further east
The word for "Russian" can be reconstructed for Proto-Permic as *rôć . Besides Komi-Zyrian роч / roć, this develops also into Komi-Yazva ruć, Udmurt ӟыч / dźuć. The word serves further as a source for exonyms of the Russians in several languages spoken in Siberia. The name surfaces in Mansi as roš, ruš, in Khanty as ruś, ruť, rüť depending on the variety, and in Selkup as ruš.

Alternate anti-Normanist theories

A number of alternative etymologies have been suggested. These are derived from the "anti-Normanist" school of thought in Russian historiography during the 19th century and in the Soviet era. These hypotheses are considered unlikely in Western mainstream academia.
Slavic and Iranian etymologies suggested by "anti-Normanist" scholars include:
 The Roxolani, a Sarmatian  (i. e., Iranian) people who inhabited southern Ukraine, Moldova and Romania;
 Several river-names in the region contain the element rus/ros and these might be the origin of the name of the Rus'. In Ukraine, the Ros and Rusna, near Kiev and Pereyaslav, respectively, whose names are derived from a postulated Slavic term for "water", akin to rosa (dew), rusalka (water nymph), ruslo (stream bed). (A relation of rosa to the Sanskrit rasā́- "liquid, juice; mythical river" suggests itself; compare Avestan Raŋhā "mythical stream" and the ancient name of the Volga River, Ῥᾶ Rā, from a cognate Scythian name.)
 Rusiy (Русый), light-brown, said of hair color (the translation "reddish-haired", cognate with the Slavic "ryzhiy", "red-haired", is not quite exact);
 A postulated proto-Slavic word for "bear", cognate with arctos and ursus.

The name Rus may have originated from the Iranian name of the Volga River (by F. Knauer, Moscow 1901), as well as from the Rosh of Ezekiel. Prof. George Vernadsky has suggested a derivation from the Roxolani or from the Aryan term ronsa (moisture, water).  River names such as Ros are common in Eastern Europe.

The Russian linguist Igor Danilevsky, in his Ancient Rus as Seen by Contemporaries and Descendants, argued against these theories, stating that the anti-Normanists neglected the realities of the Ancient Slavic languages and that the nation name Rus could not have arisen from any of the proposed origins.
 The populace of the Ros River would have been known as Roshane;
 Red-haired or bear-origined people would have ended their self-name with the plural -ane or -ichi, and not with the singular -s' (red hair is one of the natural hair colors of Scandinavians and other Germanic peoples);
 Most theories are based on a Ros- root, and in Ancient Slavic an o would never have become the u in Rus.

Danilevskiy further argued that the term followed the general pattern of Slavic names for neighboring Finnic peoples—the Chud', Ves', Perm', Sum', etc.—but that the only possible word that it could be based on, Ruotsi, presented a historical dead-end, since no such tribal or national name was known from non-Slavic sources. "Ruotsi" is, however, the Finnish name for Sweden.
Danilevskiy shows that the oldest historical source, the Primary Chronicle, is inconsistent in what it refers to as the "Rus'": in adjacent passages, the Rus' are grouped with Varangians, with the Slavs, and also set apart from the Slavs and Varangians. Danilevskiy suggests that the Rus' were originally not a nation but a social class, which can explain the irregularities in the Primary Chronicle and the lack of early non-Slavic sources.

From Rus' to Russia 
In modern English historiography, common names for the ancient East Slavic state include Kievan Rus or Kyivan Rus (sometimes retaining the apostrophe in Rus, a transliteration of the soft sign, ь),  Kievan or Kyivan Rus, and Kyivan or Kievan Ruthenia. It is also called the Princedom or Principality of Kyiv or Kiev, or just Kyiv or Kiev.

The term Kievan Rus was established by modern historians to distinguish the period from the 9th century to the beginning of the 12th century, when Kiev was the center of a large state.

The vast political state was subsequently divided into several parts. The most influential were, in the south, Kingdom of Galicia–Volhynia and in the north, Vladimir-Suzdal and the Novgorod Republic.

Northeast principalities 
In the 14th–16th centuries most of northeastern Rus' principalities were united under the power of the Grand Duchy of Moscow, once a part of Vladimir-Suzdal, and formed a large state. While the oldest endonyms were Rus and the Rus' land or Russian land, a new form of its name, Rusia or Russia, appeared in the 15th century, and became common thereafter. In the 1480s Muscovite state scribes Ivan Cherny and Mikhail Medovartsev mention Russia under the name Росиа, Medovartsev also mentions "the sceptre of Russian lordship (Росийскаго господства)". In the following century Russia co-existed with the old name Rus'  and appeared in an inscription on the western portal of the Transfiguration Cathedral of the Spaso-Preobrazhensky Monastery in Yaroslavl (1515), on the icon case of the Theotokos of Vladimir (1514), in the work by Maximus the Greek, the Russian Chronograph written by Dosifei Toporkov (?–1543/44) in 1516–22 and in other sources.

By the 15th century, the rulers of the Grand Duchy of Moscow had incorporated the northern parts of the former Kievan Rus'. Ivan III of Moscow was the first local ruler to claim the title of "Grand Prince of all Rus'" This title was used by the Grand Dukes of Vladimir since the early 14th century, and the first prince to use it was Mikhail of Tver.

Tsardom of Russia 
In 1547, Ivan IV assumed the title of "Tsar and Grand Duke of all Rus'" (Царь и Великий князь всея Руси) and was crowned on 16 January, thereby proclaiming the Tsardom of Russia, or "the Great Russian Tsardom", as it was called in the coronation document, by Constantinople Patriarch Jeremiah II and in numerous official texts, but the state partly remained referred to as Moscovia throughout Europe, predominantly in its Catholic part, though this Latin term was never used in Russia. The two names "Russia" and "Moscovia" appear to have co-existed as interchangeable during the later 16th and throughout the 17th century with different Western maps and sources using different names, so that the country was called "Russia, or Moscovia" or "Russia, popularly known as Moscovia". In England of the 16th century, it was known both as Russia and Muscovy. Such notable Englishmen as Giles Fletcher, author of the book Of the Russe Common Wealth (1591), and Samuel Collins, author of The Present State of Russia (1668), both of whom visited Russia, were familiar with the term Russia and used it in their works. So did numerous other authors, including John Milton, who wrote A brief history of Moscovia and of other less-known countries lying eastward of Russia, published posthumously, starting it with the words: "The Empire of Moscovia, or as others call it, Russia...".

In the Russian Tsardom, the word Russia replaced the old name Rus in official documents, though the names Rus and Russian land were still common and synonymous to it, and often appeared in the form Great Russia, which is more typical of the 17th century, whereas the state was also known as Great-Russian Tsardom.

According to  historians like Alexander Zimin and Anna Khoroshkevich, the continuous use of the term Moscovia was a result of traditional habit  and the need to distinguish between the Muscovite and the Lithuanian part of the Rus', as well as of the political interests of the Polish–Lithuanian Commonwealth, which competed with Moscow for the western regions of the Rus'. Due to the propaganda of the Commonwealth, as well as of the Jesuits, the term Moscovia was used instead of Russia in many parts of Europe where prior to the reign of Peter the Great there was a lack of direct knowledge of the country. In Northern Europe and at the court of the Holy Roman Empire, however, the country was known under its own name, Russia or Rossia. Sigismund von Herberstein, ambassador of the Holy Roman Emperor in Russia, used both Russia and Moscovia in his work on the Russian tsardom and noted: "The majority believes that Russia is a changed name of Roxolania. Muscovites ("Russians" in the German version) refute this, saying that their country was originally called Russia (Rosseia)". Pointing to the difference between Latin and Russian names, French captain Jacques Margeret, who served in Russia and left a detailed description of L’Empire de Russie of the early 17th century that was presented to King Henry IV, stated that foreigners make "a mistake when they call them Muscovites and not Russians. When they are asked what nation they are, they respond 'Russac', which means 'Russians', and when they are asked what place they are from, the answer is Moscow, Vologda, Ryasan and other cities". The closest analogue of the Latin term Moscovia in Russia was “Tsardom of Moscow”, or “Moscow Tsardom”, which was used along with the name "Russia", sometimes in one sentence, as in the name of the 17th century Russian work On the Great and Glorious Russian Moscow State.

Official state names

From Rus' to Ruthenia

Southwest principalities 
In the 13th–14th centuries, many of southwestern Rus' principalities were united under the power of the Kingdom of Rus', historiographically better known as the Kingdom of Galicia–Volhynia. Roman the Great was variously named dux Rutenorum, princeps Ruthenorum or rex Ruthenorum by Polish chroniclers. Danylo of Galicia was crowned Rex Ruthenorum or "king of the Rus'" in 1253. Alternatively, Danylo and his brother Vasylko Romanovych were styled Princeps Galiciae, Rex Russiae, and Rex Lodomeriae in Papal documents, while the population of Halych and Volhynia was called Rusciae christiani and populus Russiae amongst other names. The Gesta Hungarorum ( 1280) stated that the Carpathian mountains between Hungary and Halych were situated in finibus Ruthenie ("on the borders of Ruthenia").

Galicia–Volhynia declined by mid-14th century due to the Galicia–Volhynia Wars after the poisoning of king Yuri II Boleslav by local Ruthenian nobles in 1340. Iohannes Victiensis Liber (page 218) records the death of Boleslav as Hoc anno rex Ruthenorum moritur (...) ("In that year the king of the Ruthenians died (...)"). The Grand Duchy of Lithuania, Rus', Samogitia became its successor state, and the Kingdom of Poland later absorbed Galicia as the Rus Voivodeship. The latter became the Ruthenian Voivodeship (or "Russian") in 1434.

While in the Grand Principality of Moscow the rulers called their realm Rus, the residents of Western Rus lands called themselves Rusyny, Rusniaky or Rus'ki.

White, Black, Red 

While gradually most of the territories of the Grand Duchy of Lithuania, Rus', Samogitia retained the name Rus, some of them got more color-specific names:
 "White Rus" (Russia (Ruthenia) Alba, Belarus, Ruś Biała). This would eventually become the name of the country Belarus.
 "Black Rus" (Russia (Ruthenia) Nigra, Chorna Rus, Ruś Czarna)
 "Red Rus" (Russia (Ruthenia) Rubra, Chervona Rus, Ruś Czerwona)

Although the name Ruthenia arose as a Latinized form of the name Rus in Western European documents in medieval times, Russia was still the predominant name for Western Rus' territories up until 19th century.

Modern Ruthenia 
Later application of the name "Ruthenia" became narrowed to Carpathian Ruthenia (Karpats'ka Rus’), the northeastern part of the Carpathian Mountains, in the Kingdom of Hungary where the local Slavs had Rusyn identity. Carpathian Ruthenia incorporated the cities of Mukachevo, Uzhhorod and Prešov (Pryashiv). Carpathian Rus' had been part of the Kingdom of Hungary since 907, and had been known as "Magna Rus'" but was also called "Karpato-Rus'" or "Zakarpattya".

Little Russia, New Russia 
In 1654, under the Pereyaslav Agreement, the Cossack lands of the Zaporozhian Host were signed into the protectorate of the Tsardom of Russia, including the Cossack Hetmanate of Left-bank Ukraine, and Zaporozhia. In Russia, these lands were referred to as Little Russia (Malorossiya). Colonies established in lands ceded from the Ottoman Empire along the Black Sea were called Novorossiya "New Russia".

Ecclesiastical titles 

Originally, there was a metropolitan based in Kiev (Kyiv) calling himself "metropolitan of Kiev and all Rus'", but in 1299, the Kyivan metropolitan chair was moved to Vladimir by Metropolitan Maximos, Metropolitan of Kiev and All Rus'. One line of metropolitans settled in Moscow in 1325 and continued titling themselves "of Kiev and all Rus'".

After the 15th–16th century Moscow–Constantinople schism, the Muscovite church became autocephalous in 1589, renamed itself the Moscow Patriarchate (today better known as the Russian Orthodox Church) and switched to the title of "Patriarch of Moscow and all Rus'". On the other hand, the southwestern territories of former Kievan Rus' would undergo Polonisation and experience the 1596 Union of Brest, leading to the creation of the Ruthenian Uniate Church (Belarusian: Руская Уніяцкая Царква; Ukrainian: Руська Унійна Церква;). The primate of this church was titled "Metropolitan of Kyiv, Galicia and all Ruthenia". The Annexation of the Metropolitanate of Kyiv by the Moscow Patriarchate happened in  1685–1722.

When the Ukrainian Autocephalous Orthodox Church proclaimed itself in 1917, its primates styled themselves "Metropolitan of Kyiv and All Ukraine", thus replacing "Rus'" with "Ukraine", until 1936. From 1991 to 2000, two further patriarchs of the UAOC called themselves "Patriarch of Kyiv and all Rus-Ukraine", but then "Rus" was definitively dropped from the name. After the Unification Council of 2018 which established the Orthodox Church of Ukraine (OCU), the title of Metropolitan of Kyiv and All Ukraine was first held by Epiphanius I of Ukraine. His rival Filaret (Denysenko) of the Ukrainian Orthodox Church – Kyiv Patriarchate (UOC-KP) continues claiming the title "Patriarch of Kyiv and All Rus'-Ukraine". Onufriy (Berezovsky) of the Ukrainian Orthodox Church (Moscow Patriarchate) (UOC-MP) also claims the title of "Metropolitan of Kyiv and All Ukraine", and in 2022 the UOC formally cut ties with the Russian Orthodox Church.

See also 
 Name of Ukraine

References

Citations

Sources 

 
  (first published 2012 by Рукописные памятники Древней Руси [Manuscript monuments of ancient Rus'], Moscow). 
 E. Nakonechniy. The Stolen Name: How the Ruthenians became Ukrainians. (Lviv, 1998)
 P. Pekarskiy. Science and Literature in Russia in the Age of Peter the Great. (St Petersburg, 1862)
 S. M Solovyov. History of Russia since the Ancient Times. (Moscow, 1993)
 Hakon Stang, The Naming of Russia (Oslo: Meddelelser, 1996).
 Y. M. Suzumov. Etymology of Rus (in Appendix to S. Fomin's "Russia before the Second Coming", available on-line in Russian.)
 
 Zerkalo Nedeli (Mirror Weekly):
 "How Rusyns Became Ukrainians", Zerkalo Nedeli (Mirror Weekly), July 2005. Available online in Russian and in Ukrainian.
 "Such a Deceptive Triunity", Zerkalo Nedeli (Mirror Weekly), 2–8 May 1998. Available online in Russian and in Ukrainian.
 "We Are More 'Russian' than Them:  a History of Myths and Sensations",  Zerkalo Nedeli (Mirror Weekly), 27 January – 2 February 2001. Available online in Russian and in Ukrainian.

Country name etymology
Name
Viking Age populated places
Exonyms
Ethnonyms
Saga locations
History of Russia